The French State, popularly known as Vichy France, as led by Marshal Philippe Pétain after the Fall of France in 1940 before Nazi Germany, was quickly recognized by the Allies, as well as by the Soviet Union, until 30 June 1941 and Operation Barbarossa. However France broke with the United Kingdom after the destruction of the French Fleet at Mers-el-Kebir. Canada maintained diplomatic relations until the occupation of Southern France (Case Anton) by Germany and Italy in November 1942.

Relationships with the Axis

Germany
The armistice after Germany defeated France in June 1940, included numerous provisions, all largely guaranteed by the German policy of keeping 2 million French prisoners of war in Germany, effectively as hostages. Although Vichy France was nominally in control of all of France–apart from Alsace Lorraine–in practice the Germans controlled over half of the country, including the northern and western coasts, the industrial northeast, and the Paris region. Further, Italy, Germany's fascist ally, controlled a portion of south-east France. The Pétain government in Vichy controlled the rest until November 1942, when Germany and Italy occupied the remainder. At that point, the Vichy regime became entirely a puppet of the German occupiers. Germany wanted food, minerals, and industrial productions, as well as volunteers to work in German factories. Vichy was allowed to control its foreign colonies—to the extent it could defend them against the Free French—as well as its fleet, to the extent it could defend it against British naval attacks. The small town of Montoire-sur-le-Loir was the scene of two meetings. On October 22, 1940, Pierre Laval met with Hitler to set up a meeting on October 24 between Hitler and Pétain. It ended in a much-publicized handshake between the two, but in fact their discussions had been entirely general and no decisions had been made. Hitler was impressed with Petain's commitment to defend the French Empire. False rumours abounded that France had made major concessions regarding colonies and German control of French ports and the French fleet. Vichy France never joined the Axis alliance, however.

Italy
Vichy's relations with Italy were regulated by the Armistice of Villa Incisa (25 June 1940) and overseen by the Italian Armistic Commission with France. Italian delegations were sent to Vichy-controlled territories of Algeria, Djibouti, Morocco, Syria and Tunisia.

Relationships with the Allied powers

Australia
Australia maintained, until the end of the war, full diplomatic relations with the Vichy Regime and entered also into full diplomatic relations with the Free French.

Canada
Canada maintained full diplomatic relations with the Vichy Regime, until the full German occupation of the country in the beginning of November 1942.

China
Vichy France continued to maintain relations with the Republic of China government led by Chiang Kai-shek—exiled to Chongqing in the Chinese interior after the fall of the capital Nanjing to the Japanese in 1937. French diplomats throughout the country were accredited to his Chongqing government. The Vichy regime resisted Japanese pressure to recognize the Japanese puppet Reorganized National Government of China established by Wang Jingwei in 1940 in occupied Nanjing, even though the Axis did.

United Kingdom
A condition of the armistice (22 June 1940) was that France would retain the French Navy, the Marine Nationale, under strict conditions. The Pétain government pledged that the fleet would never fall into German hands, but refused to send the fleet beyond Germany's reach, either to Britain, or even to far away territories of the French Empire, such as the West Indies. This was not enough security for Winston Churchill, who feared that the French fleet could wind up in German hands and be used against British ships, which were vital to maintaining worldwide shipping and communications.

French ships in British ports were seized by the Royal Navy. Vice-Admiral Somerville, with Force H under his command, was instructed to deal with the large squadron in port at Mers El Kébir harbor near Oran in July 1940. Various terms were offered to the French squadron, but all were rejected. Consequently, Force H opened fire on the French ships, killing 1,297 French military personnel, including nearly 1,000 French sailors when the Bretagne blew up. The French squadron at Alexandria, under Admiral René-Emile Godfroy, was effectively interned until 1943 after an agreement was reached with Admiral Andrew Browne Cunningham, commander of the Mediterranean Fleet.

Less than two weeks after the armistice, Britain had fired upon forces of its former ally. The result was shock and resentment towards Britain within the French Navy, and by the general French public. Vichy severed diplomatic relations on 8 July.

United States
The United States granted Vichy full diplomatic recognition, sending Admiral William D. Leahy to France as ambassador. President Roosevelt and Secretary of State Cordell Hull hoped to use American influence to encourage those elements in the Vichy government opposed to military collaboration with Germany. U.S. attempts to work with the Vichy regime strained Anglo-American relations, as the British considered the Vichy regime to be firmly subservient to Nazi Germany. The Americans also hoped to encourage Vichy to resist German war demands, such as for the fleet, air bases in French-mandated Syria or to move war supplies through French territories in North Africa. The essential American position was that France should take no action not explicitly required by the armistice terms that could adversely affect Allied efforts in the war. The Americans ended relations when Germany occupied all of France in late 1942.

The American position towards Vichy France and de Gaulle was especially hesitant and inconsistent. Roosevelt disliked Charles de Gaulle, and agreed with Ambassador Leahy's view that he was an "apprentice dictator".

Preparing for a landing in North Africa in late 1942, the US looked for a senior French ally. They turned to Henri Giraud shortly before the landing on 8 November 1942. Finally, after François Darlan's turn towards the Free Forces, they played him against de Gaulle. US General Mark W. Clark of the combined Allied command signed a deal with Admiral Darlan on 22 November 1942 a deal in which the Allies recognized Darlan, as high commissioner for North and West Africa. Darlan was assassinated on 24 December 1942 and so Washington turned again towards Giraud, who was made High Commissioner of French North and West Africa. British resident minister Harold Macmillan brought together de Gaulle and Giraud, disparate personalities and quite hostile to each other, to serve as co-chairmen of the Committee of National Liberation. De Gaulle built a strong political base, but Giraud failed to do so and was displaced by de Gaulle.

Soviet Union
From mid-1940 until mid-1941 the Soviet Union maintained diplomatic relations with the Vichy Regime. In March 1940, the Soviet Ambassador to France, Yakov Surits, had been declared persona non grata in his host country. Afterwards, the Soviet Chargé d’Affaires in Vichy, Alexander Bogomolov, maintained contacts with the Vichy Regime. In March 1941, Bogomolov was promoted to Soviet Ambassador to France. The Vichy Ambassador to the Soviet Union, Gaston Bergery, only arrived in Moscow in late April 1941. In July 1941, the Soviet Union broke off diplomatic relations with Vichy France. Unofficial relations with Free France were established in August 1941.

Free French Forces and threat of civil war

To counter the Vichy regime, General Charles de Gaulle created the Free French Forces (FFL) after his Appeal of 18 June 1940 radio speech. Initially, Winston Churchill was ambivalent about de Gaulle and dropped ties with Vichy only when it became clear that it would not fight the Germans. Even so, the Free France headquarters in London was riven with internal divisions and jealousies.

The additional participation of Free French forces in the Syrian operation was controversial within Allied circles. It raised the prospect of Frenchmen shooting at Frenchmen and fears of a civil war. Additionally, it was believed that the Free French were widely reviled within Vichy military circles and that Vichy forces in Syria were less likely to resist the British if they were not accompanied by elements of the Free French. Nevertheless, de Gaulle convinced Churchill to allow his forces to participate, but de Gaulle was forced to agree to a joint British-Free French proclamation promising that Syria and Lebanon would become fully independent at the end of the war.

Vichy French colonies
While a few French colonies went over to the Free French immediately, many remained loyal to Vichy France. In time, the majority of the colonies tended to switch to the Allied side peacefully in response to persuasion and to changing events. But this took time. Guadeloupe and Martinique in the West Indies, as well as French Guiana on the northern coast of South America, did not join the Free French until 1943. Other French colonies had the decision to switch sides enforced more strenuously.

Saint Pierre and Miquelon
The Capture of Saint Pierre and Miquelon was a fast and bloodless operation that occurred on 24 December 1941.  A French flotilla of one submarine and three corvettes sailed from Halifax and then disembarked armed sailors at Saint-Pierre port.  The islands surrendered in twenty minutes.

Conflicts with Britain in Dakar, Syria, and Madagascar

On 23 September 1940, the British launched the Battle of Dakar, also known as Operation Menace, part of the West Africa Campaign. Operation Menace was a plan to capture the strategic port of Dakar in French West Africa, which was under the control of the Vichy French. The plan called for installing Free French forces under General Charles de Gaulle in Dakar. The allies were surprised by the Vichy garrison determination to defend the colony, having expected them to change side without opposition. By 25 September, the battle was over, the plan was unsuccessful, and Dakar remained under Vichy French control. During the battle for Dakar, Vichy had launched retaliatory bombing raids on Gibraltar, causing fairly minor damage but killing several civilians. Vichy aircraft had already bombed Gibraltar on 18 July in retaliation for the attack at Mers-el-Kébir. The failure at Dakar hurt De'Gaulles standing with the British. Hitler was pleasantly surprised with the Vichy French defense and allowed the Vichy Armistice Army limit to be increased. The Free French instead set their sights on French Equatorial Africa, which, with the exception of French Gabon, peacefully changed sides. The refusal of Gabon to change sides led to the Battle of Gabon between Free and Vichy forces, and it was soon after also under Free French control.

In June 1941, the next flashpoint between Britain and Vichy France came when a revolt in Iraq was put down by British forces. German and Italian Air Force aircraft, staging through the French possession of Syria, intervened in the fighting in small numbers. That highlighted Syria as a threat to British interests in the Middle East. Consequently, on 8 June, British and Commonwealth forces invaded Syria and Lebanon. This was known as the Syria-Lebanon Campaign or Operation Exporter. The Syrian capital, Damascus, was captured on 17 June and the five-week campaign ended with the fall of Beirut and the Armistice of Saint Jean d'Acre on 14 July 1941. 5,668 Vichy French soldiers defected to the Free French and the armistice agreement led to the repatriation of 37,563 military and civilian personnel back to France. This somewhat disappointed De'Gaulle, who had expected more to defect to his side.

From 5 May to 6 November 1942, another major operation by British forces against Vichy French territory was launched, the Battle of Madagascar. The British feared that Japanese Navy might use Madagascar as a base and thus cripple British trade and communications in the Indian Ocean. As a result, Madagascar was invaded by British and Commonwealth forces. The island fell relatively quickly and the operation ended in victory for the British. But the operation is often viewed as an unnecessary diversion of British naval resources away from more vital theatres of operation. It was agreed that the Free French would be explicitly excluded from the operation, due to tensions which had arisen from French forces fighting each other in Syria previously.

British troops would go on to come to blows with Vichy forces during Operation Torch.

French Indochina

In June 1940, the Fall of France made the French hold on Indochina tenuous. The isolated colonial administration was cut off from outside help and outside supplies. After the Japanese invasion in September 1940, the French were forced to allow the Japanese to set up military bases. This seemingly subservient behavior convinced the regime of Major-General Plaek Pibulsonggram, the Prime Minister of the Kingdom of Thailand, that Vichy France would not seriously resist a confrontation with Thailand. In October 1940, the military forces of Thailand initiated border skirmishes across the border with Indochina, which escalated into Franco-Thai War. The conflict was settled with Japanese mediation on 9 May 1941, with French Indochina losing territory to Thailand.

In March 1945, after mainland France had been liberated and the war situation looking increasingly grim for the Japanese, they staged a coup d'état in French Indochina and dissolved it, creating puppet states of its constituent parts.

French Somaliland

In the early stages of East African Campaign in 1940, constant border skirmishes occurred between the forces in French Somaliland and the forces in Italian East Africa. After the fall of France in 1940, French Somaliland declared loyalty to the Vichy France. The colony remained such during the rest of the East African Campaign, but stayed out of that conflict. This lasted until December 1942. By that time, the Italians had been defeated and the French colony had since then isolated by a British blockade. Free French and the Allied forces recaptured the colony's capital of Djibouti at the end of 1942.

French North Africa

The Allied invasion French North Africa, Morocco, Algeria, and Tunisia, started on 8 November 1942 with landings in Morocco and Algeria. The invasion, known as Operation Torch, was launched after the Soviet Union had pressed the United States and Britain to start operations in Europe, and open a second front to help reduce the pressure of German forces on the Russian troops. While the American commanders favored landing in occupied Europe as soon as possible (Operation Sledgehammer), the British commanders believed that such a move would end in disaster. An attack on French North Africa was proposed instead. This would clear the Axis Powers from North Africa, improve naval control of the Mediterranean Sea, and prepare an invasion of Southern Europe in 1943. American President Franklin Delano Roosevelt suspected the operation in North Africa would rule out an invasion of Europe in 1943 but agreed to support British Prime Minister Winston Churchill.

Leader in North Africa, 1942–43

Admiral François Darlan had landed in Algiers the day before Operation Torch. Roosevelt and Churchill accepted Darlan, rather than de Gaulle, as the French leader in North Africa. Dwight D. Eisenhower accepted Darlan as high commissioner of North Africa and French West Africa (AEF), a move that enraged de Gaulle, who refused to recognize Darlan's status. After Darlan signed an armistice with the Allies and took power in North Africa, Germany invaded Vichy France on 10 November 1942 (operation code-named Case Anton), triggering the scuttling of the French fleet in Toulon.

General Henri Giraud had switched from Vichy to the Allies and Roosevelt found him a preferable alternative to de Gaulle.
Giraud arrived in Algiers on November 10, and agreed to subordinate himself to Darlan as the French African army commander. Even though he was now in the Allied camp, Darlan maintained the repressive Vichy system in North Africa, including concentration camps in southern Algeria and racist laws. Detainees were also forced to work on the Transsaharien railroad. Jewish property was "aryanized" (i.e. stolen), and a special Jewish Affair service was created, directed by Pierre Gazagne. Numerous Jewish children were prohibited from going to school, something which not even Vichy had implemented in metropolitan France. The admiral was assassinated on 24 December 1942 in Algiers by the young monarchist Bonnier de La Chapelle, probably acting as part of a conspiracy involving Henri, Count of Paris.

Giraud became Darlan's successor in French Africa with Allied support. This occurred through a series of consultations between Giraud and de Gaulle. The latter wanted to pursue a political position in France and agreed to have Giraud as commander in chief, as the more qualified military person of the two. It is questionable that he ordered that many French resistance leaders who had helped Eisenhower's troops be arrested, without any protest by Roosevelt's representative, Robert Murphy. Later, the Americans sent Jean Monnet to counsel Giraud and to press him into repeal the Vichy laws. After very difficult negotiations, Giraud agreed to suppress the racist laws, and to liberate Vichy prisoners of the South Algerian concentration camps. The Cremieux decree, which granted French citizenship to Jews in Algeria and which had been repealed by Vichy, was immediately restored by General de Gaulle.

Giraud took part in the Casablanca conference, with Roosevelt, Churchill and de Gaulle, in January 1943. The Allies discussed their general strategy for the war, and recognized joint leadership of North Africa by Giraud and de Gaulle. Henri Giraud and Charles de Gaulle then became co-presidents of the Comité français de la Libération nationale, which unified the Free French Forces and territories controlled by them and had been founded at the end of 1943. Democratic rule was restored in French Algeria, and the Communists and Jews liberated from the concentration camps.

The Roosevelt administration was notably cool, if not hostile, to de Gaulle, especially resenting his refusal to cooperate in the Normandy invasion of 6 June 1944 (Operation Overlord). With the Vichy leaders gone from French territory, on 23 October 1944, the U.S., Britain and the Soviet Union formally recognized the Provisional Government of the French Republic (GPRF), headed by de Gaulle, as the legitimate government of France.

See also
 Diplomatic history of World War II
 History of French foreign relations

References

Further reading
 Atkin, Nicholas: Pétain, Longman, 1997.
 Azema, Jean-Pierre: From Munich to Liberation 1938-1944 (The Cambridge History of Modern France), 1985.
 Blumenthal, Henry: Illusion and Reality in Franco-American Diplomacy, 1914–1945, 1986.
 Christofferson, Thomas R., and Michael S. Christofferson: France during World War II: From Defeat to Liberation, (2nd ed.) 2006 206pp; brief introduction online edition.
 Cogan, Chales: Oldest Allies, Guarded Friends: The United States and France Since 1940, 1994.
 Gordon, B.: Historical Dictionary of World War Two France: The Occupation, Vichy and the Resistance, 1938–1946,  Westport (Conn.) 1998.
 Hurstfield, Julian G.: America and the French Nation, 1939–1945, 1986. online; replaces Langer's 1947 study of FDR and Vichy France.
 Hytier, Adrienne Doris: Two years of French foreign policy: Vichy, 1940-1942, Greenwood Press, 1974.
 Jackson, Julian: France: The Dark Years, 1940-1944 (2003) excerpt and text search; online edition.
 Langer, William: Our Vichy gamble, 1947.
 Larkin, Maurice: France since the Popular Front: Government and People 1936-1996, Oxford University Press 1997. .
 Melton, George E.: Darlan: Admiral and Statesman of France, 1881–1942, Praeger, 1998. .
 Néré, Jacques: The foreign policy of France from 1914 to 1945, Island Press, 2001.
 Nord, Philip: France's New Deal: From the Thirties to the Postwar Era, Princeton University Press 2010.
 Paxton, Robert O.:  Vichy France: Old Guard and New Order, 1940-1944, 2nd ed. 2001. Excerpt and text search.
 Rossi, Mario: "United States Military Authorities and Free France, 1942-1944." Journal of Military History (1997) 61#1 pp: 49-64.
 Smith, Colin: England's Last War Against France: Fighting Vichy, 1940–1942, London: Weidenfeld, 2009. 
 Thomas, Martin: The French Empire at War, 1940–45, Manchester University Press, 1998, paperback edition: 2007.
 Thomas, R. T.: Britain and Vichy: The Dilemma of Anglo-French Relations, 1940-42, Macmillan, 1979.
 Zamir, Meir: "De Gaulle and the question of Syria and Lebanon during the Second World War: Part I." Middle Eastern Studies 43.5 (2007): 675-708.

Vichy France
Politics of World War II
Vichy France